Christian Sackewitz (born 11 December 1955 in Göttingen) is a former professional German footballer.

Sackewitz made 134 Fußball-Bundesliga appearances during his footballing career, and was the 1979–80 2. Fußball-Bundesliga top scorer, with 35 goals in 36 games.

References

External links 
 

1955 births
Living people
Sportspeople from Göttingen
German footballers
Association football forwards
Bundesliga players
2. Bundesliga players
Hertha Zehlendorf players
Tennis Borussia Berlin players
Arminia Bielefeld players
Bayer 04 Leverkusen players
KFC Uerdingen 05 players
Eintracht Braunschweig players
Hertha BSC players
German football managers
Footballers from Lower Saxony